Dániel Hadfi (born 13 May 1982) is a Hungarian judoka.

Achievements

References

External links
 
 Videos on Judovision.org

1982 births
Living people
Hungarian male judoka
Olympic judoka of Hungary
Judoka at the 2008 Summer Olympics
21st-century Hungarian people